Jarok (locally known as Íreg) is a village and municipality in the Nitra District in western central Slovakia, in the Nitra Region. The Veľké Kostoľany transmitter, Slovakia's most powerful broadcasting facility, is situated in the village.

History
In historical records the village was first mentioned in 1113.

Geography
The village lies at an altitude of 160 metres and covers an area of 22.113 km². It has a population of about 1770 people.

Ethnicity
The village is approximately 99% Slovak.

Facilities
The village has a public library, a gym and football pitch.

Points of interests
At Jarok, there is a high power mediumwave broadcasting station. It works on 1098 kHz and uses as antenna tower a 133 metres tall guyed mast. Construction work on facility started in 1984. Inauguration was in 1988.

See also
 List of municipalities and towns in Slovakia

References

Genealogical resources

The records for genealogical research are available at the state archive "Statny Archiv in Nitra, Slovakia"

 Roman Catholic church records (births/marriages/deaths): 1763-1895 (parish A)

External links
 https://web.archive.org/web/20071027094149/http://www.statistics.sk/mosmis/eng/run.html
 Transmitter
Surnames of living people in Jarok

Villages and municipalities in Nitra District